Kinley Wangchuk is a Bhutanese politician who has been a member of the National Assembly of Bhutan since October 2018.

Education
He holds a MA degree in Diplomacy and International Studies from Rangsit University, Thailand. He completed his B.Ed from Paro College of Education, Bhutan and PgC in Journalism from Goldsmiths, University of London.

Political career
Before joining politics, he was a media consultant.

He was elected to the National Assembly of Bhutan as a candidate of DNT from Athang-Thedtsho constituency in 2018 Bhutanese National Assembly election. He received 4,001 votes and defeated Nim Gyeltshen, a candidate of DPT.

References 

1980 births
Living people
Bhutanese MNAs 2018–2023
Druk Nyamrup Tshogpa politicians
Kinley Wangchuk
Alumni of Goldsmiths, University of London
Druk Nyamrup Tshogpa MNAs